"True Colours" is a song by British band Go West, released in 1986 as the lead single from their second studio album Dancing on the Couch. It was written by Peter Cox and Richard Drummie, and produced by Gary Stevenson. "True Colours" reached No. 48 in the UK and No. 22 in Ireland.

Critical reception
Upon release, Ro Newton of Smash Hits said: "Go West are back and you'd never know they've been away. The sound is exactly the same, the formula is exactly the same. The only thing that's changed is that they sound even more like Robert Palmer." Frank Gillespie of Number One commented: "It's in the best Western tradition with the familiar sounding brassy keyboards and driving vocals but it just might be that they've left people's eyes closed for too long. The back of the record sleeve warns you not to play table tennis before listening, but this is hardly a ball-crusher of a song." In a retrospective review of Dancing on the Couch, Dan LeRoy of AllMusic described the song as "truly dire".

Track listing
7" single
"True Colours" - 3:56
"XL 5" - 2:51

2x 7" single (UK gatefold release)
"True Colours" - 3:56
"XL 5" - 2:51
"Call Me" - 4:11
"The Man in My Mirror" - 4:33

12" single
"True Colours (The Snake Charmer Mix)" - 5:04
"True Colours" - 3:56
"XL 5" - 2:52

Chart performance

Personnel
Go West
 Peter Cox - lead vocals, keyboards, percussion
 Richard Drummie - guitar, keyboards, percussion

Additional personnel
 Alan Murphy - guitar
 Dave West - keyboards
 Tony Beard - drums
 Gary Stevenson - producer
 John Gallen - engineer

Other
 Brian Griffin - photography
 John Pasche - design
 Blueprint Management Ltd. - management

References

1986 songs
1986 singles
Go West (band) songs
Chrysalis Records singles
Songs written by Peter Cox (musician)
Songs written by Richard Drummie